Roger Eugene Nelson (born June 7, 1944) is an American former professional baseball pitcher. Nelson pitched all or part of nine seasons in Major League Baseball between 1967 and 1976 with a record of 29 wins, 32 losses, and 5 saves. He attended Mount San Antonio College.

Nelson was signed by the Chicago White Sox as an amateur free agent before the 1963 season. He played four seasons in the minor leagues before earning a September call-up in 1967. He was traded along with Don Buford and Bruce Howard to the Baltimore Orioles for Luis Aparicio, Russ Snyder and John Matias on November 29, 1967. After one season with Baltimore, he was chosen by the Kansas City Royals with the first selection in the American League phase of the 1968 Major League Baseball expansion draft. Along with Wally Bunker, Nelson formed a formidable starting duo for the expansion Royals in 1969, compiling a 3.31 ERA in 29 starts. After struggling with injuries in 1970 and 1971, Nelson bounced back in 1972 to finish fifth in the league in ERA (2.08) and also setting career bests with 11 wins and 120 strikeouts. He finished his tenure with the Royals in style, throwing a complete game shutout at the Texas Rangers, 4-0, in the final regular season game ever played at Kansas City's Municipal Stadium on October 4, 1972.

Nelson was dealt along with Richie Scheinblum to the Cincinnati Reds for Hal McRae and Wayne Simpson two months later on December 1, 1972. Unfortunately, Nelson would never repeat the successes of 1969 and 1972, and he was sold back to the Chicago White Sox. He was released by the White Sox before ever pitching for them, and after a brief turn through the Oakland Athletics farm system, Nelson got one last chance with the Royals in 1976, appearing in 3 games in September to end his major league career.

References

Sources

1944 births
Living people
Baltimore Orioles players
Baseball players from Los Angeles
Chicago White Sox players
Cincinnati Reds players
Columbus Clippers players
Dorados de Chihuahua players
Evansville White Sox players
Indianapolis Indians players
Kansas City Royals players
Major League Baseball pitchers
Middlesboro Cubsox players
Mt. SAC Mounties baseball players
Omaha Royals players
Portland Beavers players
Rochester Red Wings players
Sarasota Sun Sox players
Tucson Toros players
Tidewater Tides players
Florida Instructional League White Sox players
American expatriate baseball players in Mexico